Bertus O'Callaghan (born 18 February 1988) is a Namibian rugby union player. He competed with the Namibian national team at the 2011 Rugby World Cup. He was born in Windhoek.

References

External links
ESPN Profile

1988 births
Living people
Namibia international rugby union players
Namibian rugby union players
Rugby union players from Windhoek
Rugby union hookers